Hillcrest Public School may refer to:

 Hillcrest Public School (Barrie, ON)
 Hillcrest Public School (Campbellford, ON)
 Hillcrest Public School (Mississauga)
 Hillcrest Public School (Orillia, ON)